Ng'ambo Petronella Musole (born 26 June 1998) is a Zambian footballer who plays as a goalkeeper for ZESCO United FC and the Zambia women's national team.

Club career
Musole has played for Chiparamba Breakthrough and ZESCO United FC in Zambia.

International career
Musole represented Zambia at the 2014 FIFA U-17 Women's World Cup. She capped at senior level on 28 November 2020 in a 1–0 friendly away win against Chile.

References

External links

1998 births
Living people
Zambian women's footballers
Women's association football goalkeepers
ZESCO United F.C. players
Zambia women's international footballers
Footballers at the 2020 Summer Olympics
Olympic footballers of Zambia